Woo Seung-Je (born 23 October 1982) is a South Korean former football player.

Club career
He began his professional career with Daejeon Citizen in 2005. On 8 February 2011, Woo signed for Suwon Bluewings on a three-year contract.

References

External links

1982 births
Living people
South Korean footballers
Daejeon Hana Citizen FC players
Suwon Samsung Bluewings players
K League 1 players
Association football defenders
Association football midfielders
Sportspeople from Daejeon